Bilma is an oasis town and commune in north east Niger with, as of the 2012 census, a total population of 4,016 people.
It lies protected from the desert dunes under the Kaouar Cliffs and is the largest town along the Kaouar escarpment.  It is known for its gardens, for salt and natron production through evaporation ponds, date cultivation, and as the destination of one of the last Saharan caravan routes (the Azalai, from Agadez).

Population
Its population is mostly Kanuri, with smaller Toubou, Tuareg, and Hausa populations, the last being a reminder of Bilma's role as a key stop in the Trans Saharan trade.

Administration and economy

Climate 
Bilma features a hot desert climate (Köppen climate classification BWh). The town lies deep in the heart of the Sahara Desert, more precisely in the Ténéré, a hyper-arid desert region lying over northeastern Niger and western Chad, and as such is extremely dry, averaging only  of measurable precipitation annually. Bilma is also hot during the "winter" months and extremely hot during the summer months and for prolonged periods of time.

Bilma had the country's lowest ever recorded temperature, −2.4 °C (27.7 °F), on 13 January 1995.

The sunshine duration is extremely high year-round with some 4,000 h of bright sunshine annually. The region excels at hot, sunny and dry weather.

History
The poet Abu Ishaq Ibrahim al-Kanemi was born in Bilma in the 12th century.

The isolation of Bilma made it the destination for disgraced officials under the authoritarian regime of Seyni Kountché, and a prison was built there by the government. Political leaders were held there in the 1980s, such as Sanoussi Tambari Djakou, today president of the PNA-AL, a Nigerien political party.  During French Colonial rule, Bilma was the site of a major—if isolated—military post at Fort Dromard.

In 1989, UTA Flight 772 crashed into the desert near the town after a bomb exploded on board.

References

Sources

Communes of Niger
Sahara
Oases of Niger
Tuareg